Essence & Rare 82–92 is a compilation album by Everything but the Girl, released only in Japan on 1 December 1992.

Track listing
"Meet Me in the Morning" (Ben Watt, Tracey Thorn)
"These Early Days" (Remix) (Tracey Thorn)
"Come On Home" (acoustic version) (Ben Watt, Tracey Thorn)
"Downtown Train" (Tom Waits)
"Living On Honeycomb" (Tracey Thorn)
"Each and Every One" (Ben Watt, Tracey Thorn)
"Night and Day" (Cole Porter)
"Almost Blue" (Elvis Costello)
"Native Land" (Ben Watt, Tracey Thorn)
"Draining The Bar" (Tracey Thorn)
"Oxford Street" (Tracey Thorn)
"I Don't Want to Talk About It" (Danny Whitten)
"Driving" (acoustic version) (Ben Watt)
"Take Me" (Love Mix) (Cecil Womack, Linda Womack)
"Twin Cities" (The Green Plains A Cappella Mix) (Ben Watt)
"No Place Like Home" (Paul Overstreet)
"Old Friends" (Ben Watt)

Everything but the Girl compilation albums
1992 greatest hits albums